United Nations Security Council Resolution 1799 was unanimously adopted on 15 February 2008.

Resolution 
Determining that the situation in the Democratic Republic of the Congo continued to constitute a threat to international peace and security in the region, the Security Council decided this morning to extend the sanctions regime for that country, due to expire today, until 31 March.

Unanimously adopting resolution 1799 (2008) and acting under Chapter VII of the United Nations Charter, the Council also extended until the same date the mandate of the Group of Experts monitoring the measures, as set out in resolution 1771 (2007).

The sanctions regime consists of an arms embargo against armed groups in the country that are not part of the integrated army or police units, as well as a travel ban and assets freeze on those violating the embargo, as determined in resolutions 1493 (2003), 1596 (2005), 1698 (2006) and 1771 (2007).

During the period until 31 March, the Council will continue reviewing the measures with a view to adjusting them, as appropriate, in the light of consolidation of the security situation in the country.  The Council reiterated its serious concern, however, regarding the presence of armed groups and militias in the eastern part of the country, particularly in the provinces of North and South Kivu and the Ituri district, which perpetuated a climate of insecurity in the whole region.

See also 
List of United Nations Security Council Resolutions 1701 to 1800 (2006–2008)

References

External links
Text of the Resolution at undocs.org

 1799
February 2008 events
2008 in the Democratic Republic of the Congo
 1799